The Everybody's Hungary Movement (MMM) is a Hungarian political movement established to foster independent opposition and alternatives to Fidesz candidates in local elections. The Movement, which does not describe itself as a political party, was founded by Péter Márki-Zay and associates in 2018 as a means of fostering cooperation between Hungary's fractured opposition parties. Márki-Zay won the mayoralty of Hódmezővásárhely in 2018, and in 2021 became the candidate of the United for Hungary to challenge Viktor Orbán in the 2022 parliamentary election, which he lost.

Ideology
Although the Movement is not a political party, it does have a 12-point platform, including the rule of law, freedom of the press, alignment with the West (as opposed to with Vladimir Putin), entry into the eurozone and protection of the borders against illegal immigration.

References

Notes

External links
Official website
Official website in English
2018 establishments in Hungary
Christian democracy in Europe
Conservatism in Hungary
Liberal conservatism
Opposition to Viktor Orbán
Political movements in Hungary
Pro-Europeanism